East Grand Blues (also released as Pattern Skies) is an EP by The Greenhornes.

Track listing
"I'm Going Away" – 2:55
"Shelter of Your Arms" – 4:51
"At Night" – 2:24
"Pattern Skies" – 2:14
"Shine Like the Sun" – 2:18

Personnel
Craig Fox - vocals, guitars
Patrick Keeler - drums, percussion
Jack Lawrence - bass

2005 debut EPs
The Greenhornes albums
V2 Records EPs